The Ministry of War of Saxony was a government ministry of the Kingdom of Saxony that existed from 1831 to 1919. It subsequently briefly existed as the Ministry of Defence in the Free State of Saxony from 1918 until 1919, when the new Weimar Constitution of Germany provided for the replacement of all state ministries of defence by the Federal Ministry of Defence.

Ministers of War (1831-1918) and Ministers of Defence (1918-1919)

1831–1839 Johann Adolf von Zezschwitz
1843–1846 Gustav von Nostitz-Wallwitz
1847–1848 Karl Friedrich Gustav von Oppel
1848–1849 Albrecht Ernst Stellanus von Holtzendorff
1849 Karl Friedrich August von Buttlar
1849–1866 Bernhard von Rabenhorst
1866–1891 Alfred von Fabrice
1891–1902 Paul von der Planitz
1902–1914 Max Klemens Lothar von Hausen
1914–1916 Adolph von Carlowitz
1916–1918 Karl Viktor von Wilsdorf
1918–1919 Hermann Fleissner (USPD)
1919 Gustav Neuring (SPD)
1919 Bruno Kirchhof (SPD)

Politics of Saxony
Saxony